Dippenaaria is a genus of African araneomorph spiders in the family Anapidae, containing the single species, Dippenaaria luxurians. It was  first described by J. Wunderlich in 1995, and has only been found in South Africa. The genus was named in honour of South African arachnologist Ansie Dippenaar-Schoeman.

References

Endemic fauna of South Africa
Anapidae
Monotypic Araneomorphae genera
Spiders of South Africa